Våge is a village in Austevoll municipality in Vestland county, Norway.  The village is located on the southern part of the island of Stolmen, just south of the village Årland.

References

Villages in Vestland
Austevoll